"The Thunderer" is a march composed by John Philip Sousa in 1889.
The origin of the name is not officially known, though it is speculated that it gets its name from the "pyrotechnic [effects] of the drum and bugle in [the] score." It is also one of Sousa's most famous compositions.

Composition 
The piece is in much the same manner as most of Sousa's music; however, it is one of his first "distinctly American-sounding marches." The march follows the standard form (IAABBCDCDC) that is used in many of his other works. As is common, his themes are contrasting. During the repeat of the B section, Sousa introduces new countermelodic ideas. The trio is songlike. There is a ritardando leading into the repeat of the final theme, segueing to the piece's conclusion.

See also 
 List of marches by John Philip Sousa

References

1889 compositions
Sousa marches
Parlor songs
American military marches
Concert band pieces